Procolobomatus is a genus of copepod, containing the following species:
 Procolobomatus hemilutjani Castro-Romero, 1994
 Procolobomatus hoi Madinabeitia & Iwasaki, 2013
 Procolobomatus kyphosus (Sekerak, 1970)

References

Further reading

Poecilostomatoida